JuiceCaster is a social network specifically designed for use on a mobile device, also known as a mobile social network. Users connect to the application (via juicecaster.com) using a web browser on their mobile phone. The features of the site are similar to other social networking sites. Features include mobile chat, instant messaging, photo and video sharing, as well as forums.  JuiceCaster also released Flutter for iPhone, which allows the Apple iPhone to send text, images, and location to other mobile phones.

JuiceCaster is now live with AT&T, T-Mobile, Alltel, U.S. Cellular, and Cricket. It has received awards including 3G 2007, BREW 2007, Mashable! Social Networking Awards 2006, Microsoft's Under the Radar Technology Event 2006, Meffy Awards 2008, and Webby Awards 2008.

See also
 List of social networking websites

References

External links
 
 Mashable
 JuiceCaster geotags your shared media moments
 JuiceCaster news
 JuiceCaster Beta for BlackBerry
 Flutter - iPhone Picture Messaging by JuiceCaster

American social networking websites
Internet properties established in 2004